Lloyd George Connelly, Jr. (born December 31, 1945, in Sacramento, California) is a Sacramento County, California Superior Court Judge.

Before his appointment as a judge, Connelly was a Democratic politician, serving as a member of the California State Assembly from 1982 until 1992. Prior to being elected to the State Assembly, he served as a member of the Sacramento City Council.

Connelly attended American River College and then received his undergraduate degree from California State University, Sacramento and his law degree from University of the Pacific's McGeorge School of Law.

References

External links
Join California Lloyd G. Connelly
Lloyd G. Connelly Papers

1945 births
Living people
American River College alumni
California State University, Sacramento alumni
McGeorge School of Law alumni
Democratic Party members of the California State Assembly
Sacramento City Council members
20th-century American politicians